Ariel 2, also known as UK-C, was a British radio astronomy satellite, which was operated by the Science and Engineering Research Council as part of the Ariel programme. It was launched in 1964, and became the first satellite to be used for radio astronomy, although the Canadian satellite Alouette 1 was launched 1962 and also did similar radio astronomy observations.

Launch and mission parameters

The launch of Ariel 2 was conducted by the United States National Aeronautics and Space Administration, using a Scout X-3 rocket. The launch occurred at 17:25:23 GMT on 27 March 1964, from Launch Area 3 at the Wallops Flight Facility. It ceased operations in November 1964, and subsequently decayed from orbit on 18 November 1967.

Contributions to galactic radio astronomy
One of the major scientific focuses of the Ariel 2 mission was to characterize galactic radio emissions at frequencies below 10 MHz.  Such frequencies are difficult to observe from Earth due to the influence of the ionosphere.

It was known that a non-directional antenna operating at frequencies below 10 MHz would be sensitive to galactic radio sources, with only a small contribution due to other sources.  The Ariel 2 satellite had a 40m non-directional antenna that was essentially a long wire that was unreeled from a drum in the satellite after being placed into orbit.  In order to remove the effects of Earth-based radio waves, the antenna was tuned to detect frequencies between 0.7 and 3.5 MHz.  This choice was not arbitrary.  The ionosphere effectively blocks radio waves below 4 MHz.  This is both a problem for Earth-bound radioastronomers (who cannot observe radio waves below 4 MHz) and a benefit for space-based observatories (which are not subject to noise at frequencies above 4 MHz).

The observations were processed to determine the mean sky brightness in Ariel 2's preferred frequency band.

Telemetry and data storage/transmission
Ariel 2 could transmit data at 55 samples per second when in range of a ground station.  Data transmitted in this way included operating voltages and engineering data as well as science data.  Due to the need to share the channel between multiple experiments and the engineering data itself, different data were allocated different sample rates.  For example, the galactic radio astronomy data was sampled at a rate of 1 sample every 75ms during times when the high-speed transmission was possible.

In addition, the satellite had an on-board tape recorder, which was shared between experiments.  The tape recorder was only able to sample at 1 sample per second.  The tape recorder data was downloaded using the high speed transmission channel when the satellite was in range of a ground station.

See also

Ariel programme
1964 in spaceflight

References

External links
Achieving Ariel II Design Compatibility (NASA)
Ariel II Engineering Data Analysis Phase I Report, Volume 1
Ariel II Engineering Data Analysis Phase I Report, Volume 2
Ariel II Engineering Data Analysis Phase II Report
Ariel II Engineering Data Analysis Phase III (Final) Report
UK-2, the Second Anglo-American Satellite

Spacecraft launched in 1964
Space programme of the United Kingdom
United Kingdom–United States relations
Satellites formerly orbiting Earth